The Donald P. Bellisario College of Communications is the undergraduate and graduate college dedicated to the study of journalism, mass communications and media at The Pennsylvania State University in the USA. Re-established in 2017 under its new name after the producer, screenwriter and benefactor Donald P. Bellisario, the Bellisario College is home to four departments: Advertising/Public Relations, Journalism, Film Production and Media Studies, and Telecommunications and Media Industries. Offering five undergraduate majors, a master's degree in media studies, and a Ph.D. program in mass communications, the college is the largest accredited program of its kind in the United States. The college's facilities are located on the University Park campus.

Undergraduate programs
Undergraduate majors
Advertising/Public Relations
Advertising option
Public relations option
Strategic communications option (World Campus only)
Film Production
Media Studies
Journalism
Broadcast journalism option
Digital and print journalism option
Photojournalism option
Telecommunications and Media Industries
Undergraduate minors

 Digital Media Trends and Analytics
 Entrepreneurship and Innovation
 Film Studies
 Information Sciences and Technology for Telecommunications
 Media Studies
 Sports Journalism Certificate

Graduate programs
Ph.D. in mass communications
M.A. in media studies
Integrated undergraduate-graduate degree 5 year program for students to earn a B.A. and M.A in media studies
JD-MA Joint Degree—In collaboration with Penn State Law, students can earn a J.D. and M.A. in Media Studies
Master of Professional Studies in Strategic Communications — online only

History
The college dates to 1911, when the first journalism course was offered at Penn State. Though the Department of Journalism was first founded in 1930 under the School of Liberal Arts, initial course offerings eventually led to the establishment of the School of Journalism in 1955. This new school brought together the advertising program, which dates back to 1936, and the journalism program to form what became the School of Communications in 1985.

Joining the advertising/public relations and journalism programs to form a more comprehensive communications school were programs in film-video, media studies and telecommunications. The film-video program, originating in the College of Arts and Architecture, and the media studies program, previously a communications studies major housed in the College of Liberal Arts, were both introduced at Penn State in the 1960s. The telecommunications major was born in the College of Liberal Arts, dating back to the mid-1970s.

After its establishment in 1985, the School of Communications was upgraded to the College of Communications in 1995, followed by the departmentalization of the college in 2000. On April 21, 2017, the college was renamed the Donald P. Bellisario College of Communications, after the acclaimed writer, producer, director and alumnus Donald P. Bellisario committed $30 million to support students and faculty in the college and to establish the Donald P. Bellisario Media Center, which opened in 2021. The college is the largest accredited mass communications program in the United States.

Research
Arthur W. Page Center for Integrity in Public Communication
Newspaper Journalists Oral History Program
John Curley Center for Sports Journalism
Communication Technology for Development (ICT4D)
Don Davis Program in Ethical Leadership
Institute for Information Policy
Media Effects Research Laboratory
Pennsylvania Center for the First Amendment
Science Communication Program
Children, Media & Conflict Zones Laboratory
The Prison Journalism Program

Student organizations
The college has more than forty media opportunities and student organizations, both on and off campus. These include CommAgency, CommRadio, and Centre County Report.

Facilities
The college has state-of-the-art facilities, located in several buildings on the University Park campus. 

The Donald P. Bellisario Media Center (or Bellisario Media Center) opened in 2021. The media center is located in the Willard Building, and brings many of the college's facilities under one roof. The 63,000 square-foot (5,853 sq m) media center contains classrooms, offices, television studios, and spaces for film and video creation, and houses student-media operations. Funding for its construction was supported by University funds and a $30 million dollar gift from Donald P. Bellisario. Construction began in 2019. Classes were first held in the media center in August 2021.

Alumni
There are some 30,000 alumni. The program's more prominent graduates include:
Donald P. Bellisario, creator of award-winning and popular television series
Michael Fimognari, cinematographer
Don Roy King, director, Saturday Night Live
Paul Levine, novelist and TV writer
Mary Beth Long, foreign policy expert, entrepreneur, government official
Lisa Salters, reporter, ESPN/ABC
Lara Spencer, co-host, Good Morning America
Ron P. Swegman, angler, artist and author
Tom Verducci, award-winning writer and reporter, Fox Sports and Sports Illustrated
Andrew Kevin Walker, screenwriter (Se7en)
Michael Weinreb, author

See also
 Pennsylvania State University
 University Park, Pennsylvania

References

External links
 
 Pennsylvania State University

Pennsylvania State University colleges
1914 establishments in Pennsylvania